Dragan Mladenović may refer to:

 Dragan Mladenović (footballer) (born 1976), Serbian footballer
 Dragan Mladenović (handballer, born 1956), Yugoslav handball player
 Dragan Mladenović (handballer, born 1963), Serbian-French handball player and a member of a professional sports family